This list refers to inhabitants of Ancient Epirus

Mythology
Ambrax, Ambracia
Chaon
Echetus King of Epirus
Epirus, a Theban, died in Epirus.
Kallidike Queen of Thesprotians wife of Odysseus
Molossus
Pandrasus, a Greek king in medieval British legend
Thesprotus
Tyrimmas, King of Dodona; his daughter Euippe made a child with Odysseus

Aeacid dynasty
Neoptolemus (Pyrrhus)
Molossus son of Neoptolemus and Andromache
Alcon the Molossian (6th century BC) suitor of Agariste of Sicyon
Admetus of Epirus (c. 490 - 470 BC)
Tharypus
Alcetas I  (c. 385 – 370)
Neoptolemos I
Arybbas (361/360-? ВС)
Alexander I (?-330/329 BC)
Aeacides
Alcetas II (313–307 ВС)
Beroea of Epirus
Pyrrhus I (307-302 BC)
Neoptolemos II (302-295 ВС)
Alexander II of Epirus (272-255 ВС)
Olympias II of Epirus
Pyrrhus II
Ptolemy of Epirus (238-231 ВС)
Deidamia (?-231 BC)

Tribal Kings
Oroedus, king of the Parauaioi
Antiochus (King), king of the Orestae

Nobles
Sabylinthus, regent of king Tharrhypas
Kleomachos the Atintanian

In Macedon
Amyntas of Tymphaia
Attalus of Tymphaia
Myrtale (Olympias) mother of Alexander the Great
Alexander the Great through his mother Olympias
Cleopatra of Macedon
Leonidas first teacher of Alexander the Great
Arybbas (somatophylax)
Polyperchon general and regent (of Tymphaia)
Neoptolemus (general)
Polemon of Tymphaia
Pyrrhus of Epirus basileus of Macedon  (288-285 BC (divided with Lysimachus), 274-272 BC)
Simmias of Tymphaia

Athletes
Sophron of Ambracia Stadion, Olympics 432 BC
Arybbas of Epirus Tethrippon Olympics 344 BC
Tlasimachus of Ambracia  Tethrippon and Synoris Olympics  296 BC
Simacus (son of Phalacrion) Thesprotian 3rd-2nd century BC  Pancratiast, Epidauria (fined)
Alcemachus (son of Charops)   Diaulos (~400-metre race) Panathenaics 194/3 BC
-tos (son of Lysias) Chaonian, Pale (wrestling) Panathenaics 194/193 BC
Antipater of Epirus  Stadion Olympics 136 BC
Andromachus of Ambracia   Stadion Olympics 60 BC

Artists
Epigonus of Ambracia 6th-century BC musician, inventor epigonion instrument
Nicocles of Ambracia auletes
Hippasus of Ambracia tragic actor hypocrites

Priests
Silanus of Ambracia seer in Xenophon's Anabasis
Pelignas chef, sacrificer sent by Olympias to Alexander

Physicians
Philagrius of Epirus 3rd century AD

Theorodokoi
Molossian Tharyps - Chaonian Doropsos - Thesprotian Petoas, Simakos - Admatos from Poionos - Skepas, Aristodamos from Cassopea - Dioszotos from Pandosia - Schidas of Artichia -Phorbadas, Timogenes of Ambracia -Geron son of Aristodamos (Epidauros 365 BC)

Writers
Philetas of Dodona Tragoedus c. 400 - 375
Epicrates of Ambracia comic poet 4th century BC
Pyrrhus of Epirus  memoirs and books on military, mechanics and siegecraft
Nicolaus of Epirus  Tragoedus winner in Delian festival 279 BC
Glaucus of Nicopolis epigrammatic poet of Greek Anthology

References

Эпир

Ancient Epirotes